X1 Discovery, Inc., previously known as X1 Technologies, Inc., is a privately held software company, based in Pasadena, California, United States, that develops and markets products for people and organizations that need to find information quickly. It is an operating company of Idealab, and is backed by U.S. Venture Partners.

History
X1 was founded in 2003, as X1 Technologies, Inc., to sell products that allow business users to access the information that resides on one computer or across the corporate enterprise. The products feature a "find-as-you-type" interface that narrows the results list as each letter of the search term is typed or an entry is made in the metadata field, without requiring the user to press the search button again. Result details are listed in the left pane of the interface, and a preview of the file or email is displayed in the right pane. X1 searches almost 500 file-types, including email, Outlook and enterprise applications such as Oracle and Symantec Enterprise Vault even if the user does not have the associated application installed on their PC.

In late 2005, X1 entered the enterprise search market with its Enterprise Edition, which consisted of a network-based indexing server that delivers results to the Desktop Edition (now X1 Search) or via a browser client interface. In 2013, the full suite of X1 products was combined under X1. In 2015 PCMag awards Editor's Choice to X1 for "Best Desktop Search" solution and Gartner names X1 a "Cool Vendor in Endpoint Computing".

X1 was listed as one of KMWorld's "100 Companies That Matter in Knowledge Management" for four years, and as one of Gartner's "Cool Vendors in the High Performance Workplace" in 2006. It also won a PC Magazine's Award for Technical Excellence in 2004, and was reviewed by EContent Magazine. X1 has partnered with and powered search initiatives for IBM, Yahoo! and EarthLink. In 2011, X1 Discovery, Inc. was formed to expand the X1 product line to include eDiscovery and social media products. In 2012, the full suite of X1 products was combined under X1.

X1's products include: 
 Search
 Distributed Discovery
 Social Discovery

Patents
7,370,035 - Methods and systems for search indexing 
7,424,510 - Methods and systems for Web-based incremental searches
7,496,559 - Apparatus and methods for locating data 
7,945,914 - Methods and systems for performing operations in response to detecting a computer idle condition
8,019,741 - Apparatus and methods for locating data
8,856,093 - Methods and systems for search indexing

References

External links
X1 Web site (x1.com)
Search Software (X1 Search) 
eDiscovery Software (X1 Distributed Discovery) 
Social Media Investigations Software (X1 Social Discovery) 
Compare all X1 products 
About X1
Management Team

Software companies of the United States
Companies based in California